Stasi Decorations and Memorabilia, by Ralph Pickard is a three volume in-depth analysis of the socialist political culture of the Ministry for State Security (Stasi) of the German Democratic Republic (GDR). It provides rare insight into this clandestine organization using never seen before artifacts such as medals, certificates and objects to document the Stasi culture of awards and recognition.(1,2) Altogether, all three volumes contain over 900 pages with over 1700 illustrations.

Reception 

Volume I, published in 2007, was well received in the academic and collectors community.  A review by the Central Intelligence Agency's Studies in Intelligence in September 2008 stated that, "Ralph Pickard has taken a step in the direction of preserving a piece of the East German heraldic record with his new reference work." (3) David Nickles, Ph.D. observed that, "Given the tremendous growth of interest in cultural history during recent years, I hope and expect that historians will appreciate the extent to which a book like this, with its emphasis on decorations and memorabilia, sheds light on the political culture of the German Democratic Republic."(4)

Additionally, the editor of Military Trader stated in his review (March 2008 Volume 15, Issue 3); "Researchers, historians and collectors with an interest in the Cold War or East Germany's security organization will appreciate the data in the book. A large portion of the book provides detailed information on the different award documents and timelines of when these documents were in use."(5)

Volume II, published in early 2012, has been well received by both the East German collecting and academic communities.  Colonel (Ret) Friedrich Jeschonnek, a book reviewer for Hardthöhenkurier magazine stated that there is a lot of literature on the STASI that has focused on secret operations and structure.  However, there has been very little work that has focused on STASI culture which has been revealed in the photos, certificates and documents that have now been illustrated by both Volume I and II (Issue 3/2012).  He further stated, for those who are concerned with the history of the GDR, the inner workings of the Secret Police and Phaleristics of the armed forces, both Volumes I and II are a must.(6)

Hayden Peake, a book reviewer, wrote in the September 2012 Volume 56 issue of Studies in Intelligence that both Volume I and II are invaluable for those concerned in knowing more about STASI history and culture.(7)

Contents 

Volume I
 
Foreword by Ambassador Hugh Montgomery 	 
Chapter 1 Historical overview of the Early Years of East Germany and the MfS
Chapter 2 Outline of the book
Chapter 3 Documents awarded to members of the SfS and MfS during the mid 1950s
Chapter 4  Verdienstmedaille der Grenztruppen der DDR 
Chapter 5 Medaille der Waffenbrüderschaft
Chapter 6 Für Treue Dienste in der Nationalen Volksarmee
Chapter 7  Verdienstmedaille der Nationalen Volksarmee 
Chapter 8 Medaille für Vorbildlichen Grenzdienst
Chapter 9  Verdienter Mitarbeiter der Staatssicherheit 	
Chapter 10 Kampforden für Verdienste um Volk und Vaterland 	
Chapter 11 Vaterländischer Verdienstorden 	
Chapter 12 Additional DDR award documents presented to MfS personnel 	
Chapter 13 Foreign presentations to MfS personnel 	
Chapter 14 MfS Erinnerungsabzeichen 	
Chapter 15 MfS Langjährige Treue Dienste 	
Chapter 16 Document covers for MfS presentation documents 	
Chapter 17 MfS Signatures 	
Chapter 18 MfS Ausweis 	
Chapter 19 MfS Medaille 
Bibliography			 
  	
Volume II

Foreword by Ambassador Hugh Montgomery
Chapter 20 DDR and Foreign Award Documents Presented to Members and Organizations of the MfS
Chapter 21 The Wachregiment F. Dzierzynski and Other Uniformed Units with the STASI
Chapter 22 Free German Youth - Freie Deutsche Jugend - FDJ
Chapter 23 Juristische Hochschule des MfS
Chapter 24 Rank Structure, Promotion and Salary with the MfS
Chapter 25 SV Dynamo History and Memorabilia 
Chapter 26 Birthday Documents and Other MfSs Anniversary Memorabilia
Chapter 27 MfS/AfNS Retirement From Active Duty Documents
Chapter 28 KGB Badges, Documentation and Memorabilia
Chapter 29 Richard Sorge and Felix Dzierzynski Memorabilia
Chapter 30 MfS Wax Seal and Ink Stamps
Chapter 31 STASI Decorations and Memorabilia A Collectors Guide Volume 1 Update 
Bibliography

Volume III

Foreword by Jefferson Adams, Ph.D.
Chapter 32 Anti-Fascism and the MfS in East Germany
Chapter 33 Medals, Decorations and Other Memorabilia Presented to East German, Soviet and Warsaw Pact Intelligence and Security Personnel
Chapter 34 MfS and Other Eastern Bloc Intelligence and Security Services Support to the Democratic Republic of Vietnam
Chapter 35 Retirement and Reserve Abbreviations Used on MfS Award Documents
Chapter 36 Books Associated with the MfS
Chapter 37 Special Combat Forces of the MfS – Spezialkampfkräfte –
Chapter 38 STASI Decorations And Memorabilia, A Collector’s Guide – Updates To Volumes I And II
Bibliography

References 

 Pickard, Ralph (2007). STASI Decorations and Memorabilia, A Collector's Guide. Frontline Historical Publishing. .
 Pickard, Ralph (2012). STASI Decorations and Memorabilia Volume II. Frontline Historical Publishing. .
 Pickard, Ralph (2018). STASI Decorations and Memorabilia Volume III. Frontline Historical Publishing.  .
 Peake, Hayden B., The Intelligence Officer's Bookshelf, Studies in Intelligence, September 2008 Volume 52, Number 3, Page 52
 http://www.frontlinehistorical.com/reviews.html
 Adams-Graf, John, Military Trader Editor, Military Trader Magazine - Review, March 2008 Volume 15, Issue 3, Page 10 - Books in Brief section
 Jeschonnek, Friedrich, Oberst a.D., Hardthöhenkurier Magazine - Review, Issue 3/2012, page 145
 Peake, Hayden B., The Intelligence Officer's Bookshelf, Studies in Intelligence, September 2012 Volume 56, Number 3, Pages 99–100

2007 non-fiction books
2012 non-fiction books
Stasi
Works about the Cold War
Books about the Cold War
Military of East Germany

SV Dynamo
Orders, decorations, and medals of East Germany
Awards established in 1954
KGB